State Route 220 (SR 220) is a  state highway that travels entirely within Carroll County in West Tennessee.

Route description
SR 220 begins at an intersection with US 70/SR 1/SR 104 (Broadway of America) in the community of Cedar Grove. It travels to the west and curves to the northwest. After a westward jog through Lavinia, it turns to the north-northeast, along the eastern edge of the Milan Army Ammunition Plant. It briefly has a concurrency with SR 104 in the community of Whitthorne. The highway then stairsteps its way to the northwest to the town of Atwood where the route meets its northern terminus, an intersection with US 70A/US 79 /SR 76/SR 77 (Main Street).

SR 220 is not part of the National Highway System, a system of roadways important to the nation's economy, defense, and mobility.

Major intersections

Alternate route

SR 220 is one of only three Tennessee State Routes that have alternate routes. State Route 220 Alternate (SR 220 Alt. or SR 220A) is an alternate route that travels from the SR 220 mainline on the south side of Atwood to US 70A on the east side of town. Its east–west portion is known as Johnson Road, and its north–south portion is known as Norris Robinson Loop.

SR 220 Alt. begins at an intersection with the SR 220 mainline (Church Street) in the southeastern part of Atwood. Less than  later, it leaves the city limits of town. At Norris Robinson Loop, the highway turns left and follows that road until they meet their northern terminus, an intersection with US 70A/SR 77 in the eastern part of town.

SR 220 Alternate is not part of the National Highway System, a system of roadways important to the nation's economy, defense, and mobility.

See also
 
 
 List of state routes in Tennessee

References

External links
 

220
Transportation in Carroll County, Tennessee